Jean Rénald Clérismé (November 7, 1937 – October 29, 2013) was a Haitian politician, diplomat and former Catholic priest. He served as the Foreign Minister of Haiti from 9 June 2006 to 2008.  His widow is Dr. Linda Marc.

Clérsimé began his career as a Roman Catholic priest. He was ambassador of Haiti to the World Trade Organization (WTO), the International Trade Center (ITC), the United Nations Conference on Trade and Development (UNCTAD), and the International Telecommunication Union (ITU) in Geneva, Switzerland, from 2001 to 2003.

Clérsimé completed his B.A. in France, 1967; received a M.A. in Anthropology, from New York University, in 1975, and also a M.A. in Philosophy from Yale University in 1993. In addition he received his Ph.D., in Anthropology from Yale in 1996 as a Fulbright Scholar.  The title of his doctoral dissertation was "Migration and Relations of Production in the Dominican Coffee Economy: Haitian Workers on El Fondo Coffee Plantations." He was also the author of other scholarly works on Haitian society.

References

External links
 2005 Wayne State University Press Release

1937 births
2013 deaths
Foreign Ministers of Haiti
Permanent Representatives of Haiti to the World Trade Organization
Haitian diplomats
Haitian Roman Catholic priests
New York University alumni
Yale Graduate School of Arts and Sciences alumni
Laicized Roman Catholic priests